NGC 6086 is an elliptical galaxy in the constellation of Corona Borealis. It has an apparent magnitude of 12.7. A Type-cD galaxy, it is the brightest cluster galaxy in the cluster Abell 2162. In 2010, a supermassive black hole was discovered in NGC 6086.

References

External links
 

Corona Borealis
Elliptical galaxies
6086
Abell 2162